The 1976 European Curling Championships were held from December 1 to 5 at the Eissporthalle arena in West Berlin.

The Swiss men's team won their first European title and the Swedish women's team won their first European title.

For the first time, the English men's and women's teams took part in the European Championship.

Men's

Teams

Round robin

  Teams to playoffs

Playoffs

Final standings

Women's

Teams

Round robin

  Teams to playoffs

Playoffs

Final standings

References

European Curling Championships, 1976
European Curling Championships, 1976
European Curling Championships
Curling competitions in Germany
International sports competitions hosted by Germany
European Curling Championships
European Curling Championships
Sports competitions in West Berlin
1970s in West Berlin